"Low Self Opinion" is a 1992 single by Rollins Band, from the album The End of Silence.

Track listing
 "Low Self Opinion" - 5:18
 "Lie, Lie, Lie" - 7:18

Accolades

Charts

References

Rollins Band songs
1992 singles
1992 songs
Imago Records singles